What's New is an album by jazz pianist Bill Evans with flautist Jeremy Steig which was released in 1969 on the Verve label.

Reception 

Allmusic's Scott Yanow said: "this is a quartet set with guest flutist Jeremy Steig, whose playing recalls Herbie Mann's recording (Nirvana) with Evans back in the early '60s. Both flutists were always open to the influences of pop and rock, although in both of their collaborations with Evans, the music is very much on the pianist's turf".

Track listing
 "Straight, No Chaser" (Thelonious Monk) – 5:40
 "Lover Man" (Jimmy Davis, James Sherman, Roger Ramirez) – 6:19
 "What's New?" (Bob Haggart, Johnny Burke) – 4:50
 "Autumn Leaves" (Jacques Prévert, Joseph Kosma, Johnny Mercer) – 6:12
 "Time Out for Chris" (Bill Evans) – 7:17
 "Spartacus Love Theme" (Alex North) – 4:58
 "So What" (Miles Davis) – 9:06

Personnel
Bill Evans − piano
Jeremy Steig − flute
Eddie Gómez − bass
Marty Morell − drums

References

1969 albums
Verve Records albums
Bill Evans albums
Jeremy Steig albums